"Death on the Rocks" is the tenth episode of the second series of the 1960s cult British spy-fi television series The Avengers, starring Patrick Macnee and Honor Blackman. It was first broadcast by ABC on 1 December 1962. The episode was directed by Jonathan Alwyn and written by Eric Paice.

Plot
Steed and Cathy investigate a gang of criminals who are flooding the market with smuggled diamonds.

Cast
 Patrick Macnee as John Steed
 Honor Blackman as Cathy Gale 
 Meier Tzelniker as Samuel Ross  
 Gerald Cross as Fenton 
 Ellen McIntosh as Liza Denham 
 Naomi Chance as Mrs. Daniels 
 Hamilton Dyce as Max Daniels 
 David Sumner as Nicky   
 Richard Clarke as Van Berg 
 Toni Gilpin as Jackie Ross   
 Doug Robinson as Sid  
 Annette Kerr as Mrs. Ross 
 Haydn Ward as Painter 
 Jack Grossman as Diamond Dealer
 Vincent Charles as Diamond Dealer

References

External links

Episode overview on The Avengers Forever! website

The Avengers (season 2) episodes
1962 British television episodes